Melica kozlovii is a species of grass found on mountain slopes in Mongolia and China (Gansu, Qinghai, Shanxi) at  above sea level.

Description
The species is perennial loosely tufted with short rhizomes. Both the leaf-sheaths and plant stem is scabrous. The leaf-sheaths are also tubular and are closed on one end. The main branches carry 1–5 fertile spikelets and are scaberulous.

The pedicels are pubescent and hairy above. The spikelets have 2-3 fertile florets which are diminished at the apex while the sterile florets are barren, cuneate, and clumped. Both the upper and lower glumes are elliptic, keelless, membranous and have acute apexes.

The species' lemma have scabrous surface and emarginated apex. Its palea is elliptic, 2 veined, and have puberulous surface. Flowers are fleshy, oblong and truncate. The fruits are caryopsis with additional pericarp and linear hilum.

Ecology
Its flowering time is from May to August with its fruits being ripe by that time as well.

References

kozlovii
Grasses of China
Flora of Gansu
Flora of Qinghai
Flora of Shanxi
Flora of Mongolia